Esteghlal F.C. is an Iranian professional association football club base in Tehran. The club was formed in Ferdowsi Street, central Tehran on 26 September 1945 as Docharkhesavaran and was renamed to Taj F.C. on 11 February 1950. In spring of 1979 and only a few weeks after the Iranian revolution the club was renamed to its current name, Esteghlal F.C.

Key

Key to competitions 
ICT = Iran championship Tournament
ILL = Iran Local League
ILLQ = Iran Local League Qualification
TJC = Takht Jamshid Cup
TFL = Tehran Football League
TFLQ = Tehran Football League Qualification
TSL = Tehran Super League
QL =  Qods League
Div 3 =  Iran Football's 3rd Division
Div 1 = Azadegan League
IPL = Iran Pro League
ISC = Iran Super Cup
ACCT = Asian Champion Club Tournament
ACC = Asian Club Championship
ACWC = Asian Cup Winners' Cup
ACL = AFC Champions League
HC = Hazfi Cup
THC = Tehran Hazfi Cup

Key to league record 
Div = Division
P = Played
W = Games won
D = Games drawn
L = Games lost
F = Goals for
A = Goals against
Pts = Points
Pos = Final position
Q = Qualified to the final round of league
Ab = Abandoned

Key to cup record 
 DNP = Did not participate
 NH = Not held
 DNE = The club did not enter cup play
 QR1 = First qualification round
 QR2 = Second qualification round, etc.
 Group = Group stage
 GS2 = Second group stage
 R1 = First round
 R2 = Second round, etc.
 R16 = Round of 16
 QF = Quarter-finals
 SF = Semi-finals
 RU = Runners-up
 W = Winners

Key to colours

Seasons

See also 
 List of Esteghlal F.C. records and statistics
 List of Esteghlal F.C. honours

Footnotes

References

Sources 
Esteghlal seasons stats Page
Iran Premier League Stats	 	
RSSSF database about Iranian league football.		
Persian League

Bibliography 
 

Seasons
 
Esteghlal